Chasmaporthetes, also known as hunting or running hyena, is an extinct genus of hyenas distributed in Eurasia, North America, and Africa during the Pliocene-Pleistocene epochs, living from 4.9 million to 780,000 years ago, existing for about . The genus probably arose from Eurasian Miocene hyenas such as Thalassictis or Lycyaena, with C. borissiaki being the oldest known representative. The species C. ossifragus was the only hyena to cross the Bering land bridge into the Americas, and ranged over what is now Arizona and Mexico during Blancan and early Irvingtonian Land Mammal ages, between 5.0 and 1.5 million years ago.

Chasmaporthetes was one of the so-called "dog-like" hyenas (of which the aardwolf is the only survivor), a hyaenid group which, in contrast to the now more common "bone-crushing" hyenas, evolved into slender-limbed, cursorial hunters like modern canids.

Taxonomy and etymology
Chasmaporthetes was named (from chasm and the Greek , "destroyer, ravager") by Hay (1921), who noted that the name meant that the North American species,  Chasmaporthetes ossifragus (the type species) possibly saw the beginning of the Grand Canyon.

Species
At least nine species are currently recognised:

Chasmaporthetes ossifragus Hay, 1921 - North America, Pliocene to Pleistocene
C. australis Hendey, 1974 - Africa, Late Miocene
C. bonisi Koufos, 1987 - Greece, Late Miocene
C. borissiaki Khomenko, 1932 - Russia, Pliocene (disputed)
C. exitelus Kurtén & Werdelin, 1988 - China, Late Miocene
C. gangsriensis Tseng, Li, & Wang, 2013 - Asia, Early Pliocene
C. lunensis Del Campana, 1914 - Eurasia, Late Miocene to Early Pleistocene
C. melei Rook et al, 2004  - Sardinia, Early Pleistocene
C. nitidula Geraads, 1997 - Africa, Pliocene to Early Pleistocene

Anatomy and paleoecology

The limb bones of Chasmaporthetes were long and slender like those of cheetahs, and its cheek teeth were slender and sharp-edged like those of a cat. Chasmaporthetes likely inhabited open ground and was a daytime hunter. In Europe, the species C. lunensis competed with the giant cheetah Acinonyx pardinensis, and may have preyed on the small Bourbon gazelle (Gazella borbonica) and the chamois antelope (Procamptoceras brivatense). The North American C. ossifragus was similar in build to C. lunensis, but had slightly more robust jaws and teeth. It may have preyed on the giant marmot Paenemarmota, and competed with the far more numerous Borophagus diversidens. A study on the genus' premolar intercuspid notches indicated Chasmaporthetes was likely hypercarnivorous rather than durophagous as its modern cousins (excluding the aardwolf) are.

References

External links
Anton, M., Turner, A., Salesa, M. J., Morales, J. A complete skull of Chasmaporthetes lunensis (Carnivora, Hyaenidae) from the Spanish Pliocene site of La Puebla de Valverde (Teruel) Estudios Geol., Vol. 62, n.º 1, 375-388, enero-diciembre 2006. 

Prehistoric hyenas
Pliocene carnivorans
Pleistocene carnivorans
Pleistocene genus extinctions
Prehistoric carnivoran genera
Fossil taxa described in 1921
Ringold Formation Miocene Fauna